The 1963–64 Greenlandic Football Championship (also known as the  Grønlandturneringen, Fodboldmesterskab i Grønland or ) was the 4th edition of the Greenlandic Men's Football Championship. The tournament was played in four regional groups, where two teams advanced to the regional qualifying finals. The winners of these qualifiers advanced to the final knockout phase, which was held at Nuuk Stadium in Nuuk. It was won by Kissaviarsuk-33 who defeated Nanok in the final.

Background
The first federation to organise a national football championship in Greenland was the GIF, a general sports federation that organised more than just football tournaments, founded on 3 September 1953 at a meeting attended by eleven clubs from Upernavik, Uummannaq, Qeqertarsuatsiaat, Qasigiannguit, Aasiaat, Sisimiut, Maniitsoq, Nuuk, Paamiut and Qaqortoq. The 1954–55 tournament was the first national football tournament and GIF continued to organise the competition, usually announced as Fodboldturneringen, Grønlandturneringen or Fodboldmesterskab i Grønland, until 1970. For the first decade of its existence, the tournament was held sporadically, with iterations often taking more than a year to complete. In 1971 a football specific federation, the Football Association of Greenland (Greenlandic: Kalaallit Nunaanni Isikkamik Arsaattartut Kattuffiat), was founded, and took over the organisation of the tournament.

Format
The first phase of the tournament split the teams into four geographic pools, with three of these pools containing two groups and the pool containing the most teams (North Greenland) being split into three groups. The group winners then played off directly to qualify for the final phase, with two of North Greenland's pool winners playing in a semi final before meeting Nanok, the other pool's winner and reigning champions in their geographic final.

The final phase saw the four regional champions play in a knockout series, held in Nuuk in September, 1964.

Knockout stage

References

Greenlandic Men's Football Championship seasons
Foo
Foo
Green